Nirajan Khadka (born 6 October 1988) is a professional footballer from Nepal. He made his first appearance for the Nepal national football team in 2008.

Club career 
Khadha started his career at Friends Club for two years, before joining Manang Marshyangdi Club for three years. Khadka then rejoined Friends Club for one season, and then rejoined Manang Marshyangdi Club for another season. In 2012, he moved to the Three Star Club where he plays now.

National career 
Khadka has played for Nepal at the 2009 Nehru Cup, AFC Challenge Cup Quantifying, 2011 SAFF Championship, and the 2012 AFC Challenge Cup. He has also represented his country 4 times in world cup qualifying.

International goals
Scores and results list Nepal's goal tally first.

References

External links
 
 

1988 births
Living people
Nepalese footballers
Nepal international footballers
Manang Marshyangdi Club players
Association football midfielders